Sarab (also Romanized as Sarāb; also known as Dowlatābād, Sarāb-e Eyvān, and Sār Sarāb) is a village in Sarab Rural District, in the Central District of Eyvan County, Ilam Province, Iran. At the 2006 census, its population was 1,522, in 349 families. The village is populated by Kurds.

References 

Populated places in Eyvan County
Kurdish settlements in Ilam Province